Sterno is a brand of jellied, denatured alcohol sold in a can and meant to be burned directly in its can. Its primary uses are in food service for buffet heating, in the home for fondue, and as a chafing fuel for heating chafing dishes. Other uses are for portable stoves and as an emergency heat source. It is also a popular fuel for use with toy and model steam and other external combustion engines.

The flame is typically lighted with a match or lighter and extinguished by placing the lid over the can to starve it of air. When the lid is missing, a spatula or saucer suffices to snuff out the flame.

History 

The Sterno brand and trademark is owned by Sterno Products, a portfolio company of Westar Capital LLC, based in Corona, California. The brand was purchased from Blyth, Inc. in late 2012. Blyth had acquired the business from Colgate-Palmolive in 1997.

The name comes from that of the original manufacturer, S. Sternau & Co. of Brooklyn, New York, a maker of chafing dishes, coffee percolators and other similar appliances since 1893. It had previously applied the name to its "Sterno-Inferno" alcohol burner. In 1918, it promoted its Sterno Stove as being a perfect gift for a soldier going overseas. In his book With the Old Breed, E. B. Sledge describes its use on the battlefields of the Pacific Theatre in 1944 and 1945.

Invented around 1900, Sterno is made from ethanol denatured by adding methanol, water, and an amphoteric oxide gelling agent, plus a dye that gives it a characteristic pink color. The methanol is added to denature the product, which is intended to make it too toxic for consumption. Designed to be odorless, a  can will burn for up to two hours. It was discovered as a byproduct of the nitrocellulose manufacturing process.

Abuse 
There are many instances of people drinking Sterno to become intoxicated as a form of surrogate alcohol. Since the alcohol it contains is denatured, Sterno is poisonous. Moreover, the methanol it contains can cause permanent blindness by destruction of the optic nerves. Bluesman Tommy Johnson alludes to the practice in his song "Canned Heat Blues" recorded in 1928. The blues band Canned Heat derived their name from the song.

The practice is said to have become popular during Prohibition and during the Great Depression in hobo camps, or "jungles", when the Sterno would be squeezed through cheesecloth or a sock and the resulting liquid mixed with fruit juice to make "jungle juice", "sock wine", or "squeeze".

The 1956 American documentary On the Bowery includes footage of three homeless men straining Sterno cooking fuel to make "squeeze" and then drinking the alcohol.

In an article for the Journal of the American Medical Association in 1961, Capt. James H. Shinaberger, MC, writes about a study of three people who had suffered methanol poisoning as a result of drinking Sterno. One of the patients "had been drinking Sterno for about a week and had been in the city prison for 48 hours when severe abdominal pain and vomiting occurred".

In December 1963, a rash of 31 deaths in Philadelphia's homeless population was traced to a local store that knowingly sold Sterno to people for them to consume and get drunk.

See also 
Beverage-can stove
Calcium acetate
Hexamine fuel tablet
Portable stove

References

External links 
 
 Material Safety Data Sheets

Camping equipment
Fuels
Alcohol abuse